Kate Jennifer Jones (born 10 April 1979) is an Australian former politician from Queensland. She served as a Labor Party Member of Parliament in the Legislative Assembly of Queensland from 2006 to 2012, and again from 2015 to 2020. Jones first represented the seat of Ashgrove until she was defeated by eventual Premier Campbell Newman at the 2012 state election. Jones retook the seat for the Labor Party at the 2015 state election. The seat was abolished prior to the 2017 state election, so Jones contested and won the new seat of Cooper at that election. In the Palaszczuk Government, she was the Minister for Innovation and Tourism Industry Development, Minister for State Development and the Minister for the Commonwealth Games.

Education and community involvement
Jones attended Kelvin Grove State High School in Kelvin Grove. In 1995 she was the Premier of the first ever YMCA Queensland Youth Parliament, a non-partisan political program for young people. She completed her Bachelor of Arts in Politics and Journalism at the Queensland University of Technology while working part-time at The Gap Markets, and graduated with a Master of Environmental Law from the Australian National University in 2014.

Jones is a member of the Ashgrove Historical Society, Ashgrove Climate Change Action Group and sits on the management committee of the Enoggera Respite Centre. She is also a member of The Fred Hollows Foundation and World Vision.

Political career
Before entering Parliament, Jones worked as a Senior Media Adviser to Queensland Minister for Public Works, Housing and Racing Robert Schwarten and as Media Adviser to former Queensland Treasurer David Hamill.

Jones was elected to state Parliament for the seat of Ashgrove at the 2006 general election to succeed Jim Fouras, who had served as Speaker of the Legislative Assembly during the 1990s. After retaining her seat in the 2009 election, she was appointed Minister for Climate Change and Sustainability in the new Bligh cabinet, replacing Andrew McNamara.

2012 election
Jones stood down from cabinet on 19 June 2011 to focus on defending her seat against newly elected LNP leader Campbell Newman at the 2012 state election.

During the campaign Jones used lolly-pink branding rather than Labour's color of red; this tactic was copied from an approach used by Kevin Rudd. Jones' supporters were issued pink T-shirts with the words "Keep Kate".

At that election, Jones was defeated, suffering a 13 percent swing as part of the LNP's massive victory. Newman became Premier.

2015 election

Jones sought to regain her old seat in the January 2015 state election.  She won, defeating Newman on a swing of 10 percent—more than double what she needed.  She became the second challenger to unseat a sitting premier in Queensland, the previous time this happened was in 1915.

2017 election 
Ashgrove was abolished prior to the 2017 state election, so Jones contested and won the new seat of Cooper.

Palaszczuk government

On 16 February 2015, Jones was sworn in as Minister for Education, Minister for Tourism, Major Events and Small Business and Minister for the Commonwealth Games in the Palaszczuk Ministry, positions she held until 11 December 2017.

On 12 December 2017, she was sworn in as Minister for Innovation and Tourism Development and Minister for the Commonwealth Games.

Jones announced her retirement on 10 September 2020, the last sitting day before the 2020 Queensland state election in October.

Personal life
Kate Jones is married to Paul Cronin (former chief media adviser to Queensland Premiers Anna Bligh and Peter Beattie, and who now heads media relations at Queensland Rail).  They have a son, Thomas Anthony Cronin, who was born in 2010.

References

External links
 Kate Jones — State Member for Ashgrove

1979 births
Living people
Members of the Queensland Legislative Assembly
Politicians from Brisbane
Queensland University of Technology alumni
Australian Labor Party members of the Parliament of Queensland
Labor Right politicians
21st-century Australian politicians
21st-century Australian women politicians
Women members of the Queensland Legislative Assembly